The Oglethorpe Stormy Petrels football team represented Oglethorpe University in college football. They have not competed since 1941 when World War II shut down all sports in 1942.

History

Frank B. Anderson established the football and baseball programs in 1917. Jogger Elcock was the team's next coach. Under Harry J. Robertson, the team won a Southern Intercollegiate Athletic Association (SIAA) conference title on the back of Adrian Maurer in 1924 and 1925. The 1926 team defeated Georgia Tech, and the 1929 team beat Georgia.

Notable players
 Edgar David
 Adrian Maurer
 Charlie Waller
 Luke Appling

References

External links 

 

 
American football teams established in 1917
American football teams disestablished in 1941
1917 establishments in Georgia (U.S. state)
1941 disestablishments in Georgia (U.S. state)